Operation Staysafe is a scheme introduced in England in 2008 which gave police the power to hand young people over to social workers.

The scheme also has extra officers patrolling during the Christmas period to help reduce alcohol-related crime.

References

Law enforcement in England and Wales
Programmes of the Government of the United Kingdom
Juvenile law
Youth in England
Alcohol abuse in the United Kingdom
Social care in England
Alcohol law in the United Kingdom
Drugs in England